Notocyphus is a genus of spider wasps, belonging to the family Pompilidae. They are the only genus in the monotypic subfamily Notocyphinae. These wasps are found in the Nearctic and the Neotropics.

Species
The following species are included in the genus Notocyphus:

 Notocyphus abdominalis Lucas, 1897
 Notocyphus abnormis (Taschenberg, 1869)
 Notocyphus adoletis Banks, 1945
 Notocyphus albopictus Smith, 1862
 Notocyphus alboplagiatus (F.Smith)
 Notocyphus anacaona Rodriguez & Pitts, 2012
 Notocyphus apicalis Cameron, 1893
 Notocyphus atratus Banks, 1947
 Notocyphus aurantiicornis Lucas, 1897
 Notocyphus bicolor Lucas, 1897
 Notocyphus bimaculatus Lucas, 1897
 Notocyphus bipartitus Banks, 1947
 Notocyphus brevicornis Fox, 1897
 Notocyphus chiriquensis Cameron, 1893
 Notocyphus compressiventris (Cresson, 1865)
 Notocyphus conspicua (Smith, 1873)
 Notocyphus crassicornis (Smith, 1864)
 Notocyphus deceptus Banks, 1947
 Notocyphus dolorosus Banks, 1947
 Notocyphus dorsalis Cresson, 1872
 Notocyphus dubius Fox, 1897
 Notocyphus erythronotus Lucas, 1897
 Notocyphus femoratus Lucas, 1897
 Notocyphus ferrugineus Fox, 1897
 Notocyphus fraternus Banks, 1947
 Notocyphus fulvus Lucas, 1897
 Notocyphus fumipennis (Cameron, 1891)
 Notocyphus fuscus Lucas, 1897
 Notocyphus griseus Lucas, 1897
 Notocyphus inornatus Banks, 1947
 Notocyphus joergenseni Brèthes, 1909
 Notocyphus laetabilis (Smith, 1873)
 Notocyphus lucasi Banks, 1945
 Notocyphus lugubris (Smith, 1873)
 Notocyphus lunulatus Lucas, 1897
 Notocyphus luteipennis Lucas, 1897
 Notocyphus macrostoma Kohl, 1886
 Notocyphus maculifrons Smith, 1873
 Notocyphus melanosoma Kohl, 1886
 Notocyphus minimus Lucas, 1897
 Notocyphus morosus Banks, 1947
 Notocyphus multipicta (Smith, 1873)
 Notocyphus nessus Banks, 1945
 Notocyphus nigrinus Banks, 1947
 Notocyphus nubilipennis Fox, 1897
 Notocyphus obscuripennis Fox, 1897
 Notocyphus octomaculatus Arnold, 1951
 Notocyphus ordinaria (Smith, 1873)
 Notocyphus ornatus Banks, 1947
 Notocyphus pallidipennis Banks, 1947
 Notocyphus pictipennis Fox, 1897
 Notocyphus plagiatus Smith, 1862
 Notocyphus procris Banks, 1947
 Notocyphus rixosus Smith, 1855
 Notocyphus rubriventris Brèthes, 1909
 Notocyphus rufigaster Banks, 1945
 Notocyphus saevissimus Smith, 1855
 Notocyphus sericeus Banks, 1947
 Notocyphus sigmoides Banks, 1947
 Notocyphus signatus Banks, 1947
 Notocyphus similis Fox, 1897
 Notocyphus stahli Lucas, 1897
 Notocyphus terminatus Fox, 1897
 Notocyphus thetis Banks, 1945
 Notocyphus tyrannicus Smith, 1855
 Notocyphus unicinctus Brèthes, 1913
 Notocyphus variegatus Banks, 1947
 Notocyphus vindex Smith, 1864
 Notocyphus violaceipennis Cameron, 1893
 Notocyphus williamsi Banks, 1947
 Notocyphus xanthoproctus Lucas, 1897

References

Pompilidae
Taxa named by Frederick Smith (entomologist)